Lenox is an unincorporated community in Preston County, West Virginia, United States. Its post office has been closed.

References 

Unincorporated communities in West Virginia
Unincorporated communities in Preston County, West Virginia